Andrea Piccini (born 12 December 1978 in Sansepolcro) is an Italian racing driver who is the part-owner and team principal of the Iron Lynx Motorsport Lab ELMS and Italian F4 team.

Single Seaters
Piccini began his single seater career in 1994, when he began competing in go-kart races. In 1997, he started competing in Formula Opel Europe. He finished third in the 1998 standings. He went on to race in International Formula 3000 in 1999 up until 2001, picking up only six points in the three seasons. In 2001, he was signed as a test driver for the European Minardi Formula One.

Sports Cars
After a disappointing single-seater career, he went on to race in sports car racing. In 2003, he was signed by Lister Racing to compete in the FIA GT Championship. He picked up three podiums for the team along with Swiss co-driver Jean-Denis Délétraz. He was signed by Aston Martin Racing in 2006 who wanted to race their new GT1-spec DBR9. He raced two rounds of the American Le Mans Series, scoring in one of those events, being round five. He then went on to compete at the 24 Hours of Le Mans and finished second in the GT1 class with teammates Tomáš Enge and Darren Turner. He reunited with his 2003 FIA GT teammate Jean-Denis Délétraz for the 2006 season. They raced for Phoenix Racing who ran a DBR9. Piccini finished third in the championship, taking a win at the final round of the season.

2007 was a slightly quieter year for Piccini, he did not race at Le Mans or in ALMS but did contest the FIA GT, this time for Scuderia Playteam who ran a Maserati MC12 GT1. His teammate was reigning FIA GT co-champion Andrea Bertolini. The pair finished fifth place with only one win during the season. In 2008, Piccini raced six of the ten rounds of the FIA GT Championship, four races in the GT1 class for RBlmmo Racing and two in the GT2 class for CR Scuderia Racing. He did not earn a point for RBlmmo Racing but finished in good points scoring places for CR Scuderia, finishing fourth at the Spa 24 Hours and second place in round eight at Nogaro. He was called upon again by Aston Martin Racing to compete at the years 24 Hours of Le Mans. He managed to finish the #007 car fourth place in class with veteran teammates Heinz-Harald Frentzen and Karl Wendlinger.

He moved on from FIA GT and in 2009, he raced for Italian team Racing Box in the Le Mans Series, who ran a LMP2-spec Lola B08/80-Judd. He was joined by fellow Italian compatriots and former FIA GT champions Matteo Bobbi and Thomas Biagi for the season. They picked up a class win in the opening round at Catalunya but the success was short-lived. Piccini finished fifth in the standings. Racing Box then entered the 24 Hours of Le Mans with the same car but unfortunately retired after 203 laps. 2010 saw Piccini contest only the first two rounds of the Le Mans Series season for Racing Box, before returning to GT racing in the form of the FIA GT1 World Championship. He was reunited with Phoenix Racing who he raced with in FIA GT in 2006, but raced a Chevrolet Corvette C6.R rather than the DBR9. He contested three of the ten rounds, earning an impressive podium finish at the opening round in Abu Dhabi alongside Mike Hezemans. He is now back behind the wheel of an Aston DBR9 for Hexis AMR for the 2011 FIA GT1 World Championship season.

Racing record

Complete International Formula 3000 results
(key) (Races in bold indicate pole position) (Races in italics indicate fastest lap)

Complete 24 Hours of Le Mans results

Complete GT1 World Championship results

References

External links

1978 births
Living people
People from Sansepolcro
Italian racing drivers
FIA GT Championship drivers
American Le Mans Series drivers
European Le Mans Series drivers
FIA GT1 World Championship drivers
EFDA Nations Cup drivers
Blancpain Endurance Series drivers
ADAC GT Masters drivers
International GT Open drivers
24 Hours of Spa drivers
24 Hours of Le Mans drivers
Sportspeople from the Province of Arezzo
International Formula 3000 drivers
DAMS drivers
Phoenix Racing drivers
Aston Martin Racing drivers
CRS Racing drivers
Ombra Racing drivers
AF Corse drivers
W Racing Team drivers
Nürburgring 24 Hours drivers
Le Mans Cup drivers
Iron Lynx drivers